Choi Myeong-jin (also transliterated Choi Myung-jin, born 15 March 1956) is a South Korean equestrian. He competed at the 1988 Summer Olympics and the 1992 Summer Olympics.

References

External links
 

1956 births
Living people
South Korean male equestrians
South Korean dressage riders
Olympic equestrians of South Korea
Equestrians at the 1988 Summer Olympics
Equestrians at the 1992 Summer Olympics
Place of birth missing (living people)
Asian Games medalists in equestrian
Equestrians at the 1986 Asian Games
Equestrians at the 1994 Asian Games
Equestrians at the 1998 Asian Games
Asian Games gold medalists for South Korea
Asian Games silver medalists for South Korea
Medalists at the 1986 Asian Games
Medalists at the 1994 Asian Games
Medalists at the 1998 Asian Games
20th-century South Korean people
21st-century South Korean people